Because it is a U.S. territory instead of a U.S. state, voters in Guam are ineligible to elect members of the Electoral College, who would then in turn cast direct electoral votes for president and for vice president. The territory nonetheless conducts a non-binding straw poll on the day of the presidential general election to gauge the preference for president every election year.

The poll has been held in Guam during every presidential election since 1980. It was established after the Legislature of Guam passed Public Law 15-49, which requires the Guam Election Commission to conduct the poll. The law also instructs the Chairman of the Board of the Guam Election Commission to essentially conduct a meeting of electors like those in the states and act as the territory's sole elector, including formally casting an electoral college ballot for the presidential ticket receiving the highest number of votes in the territory, and then officially sending the result to the U.S. Congress.

Because Guam is 15 hours ahead of the contiguous United States, the poll is regarded as an indicator of how the rest of the country will vote. The territory is home to three U.S. military bases and current and former service members, and has historically had a higher voter turnout than the mainland. Since 1980, the results of the Guam poll have aligned with the results of the mainland, except in two instances: in 1980, when the islanders favored Jimmy Carter, and in 2016, when they favored Hillary Clinton.

Results
Winners of the territory are in bold.

Notes

References